Chinazom Doris Amadi (born 12 September 1987) is a Nigerian long jumper.

She won the bronze medal at the 2006 African Championships. At the 2007 All-Africa Games she finished fourth, missing the bronze medal by a two centimetre margin. At the 2008 African Championships she won the silver medal.

She was the gold medallist in the long jump at the 2015 African Games, but was stripped of this title after failing a drug test for methenolone. She was banned for four years, until 15 September 2019.

References

1987 births
Living people
Nigerian female long jumpers
Nigerian sportspeople in doping cases
Doping cases in athletics
Athletes (track and field) at the 2015 African Games
African Games competitors for Nigeria